The 1844 United States presidential election in North Carolina took place between November 1 and December 4, 1844, as part of the 1844 United States presidential election. Voters chose 11 representatives, or electors to the Electoral College, who voted for President and Vice President.

North Carolina voted for the Whig candidate, Henry Clay, over Democratic candidate James K. Polk. Clay won North Carolina by a margin of 4.63%.

With 52.39% of the popular vote, North Carolina would be Henry Clay's fourth strongest state after Rhode Island, Vermont and Kentucky. This was also the last presidential election until 1992 when a Democrat would win without carrying the state of North Carolina. James K. Polk is one of two presidents to lose his birth state in a successful presidential bid. The other is Donald Trump of New York.

Results

References

North Carolina
1844
1844 North Carolina elections